John of Sittingbourne (died before 1238) was Archbishop of Canterbury-elect in 1232.

John was a monk of Christ Church Priory, Canterbury, and was selected as prior of Christ Church in 1222. John was elected to the archbishopric on 16 March 1232, but his election was quashed on 12 June 1232 when he resigned the office at the papal court.

John died sometime before 1238.

Citations

References

 
 
 

Archbishops of Canterbury
13th-century English Roman Catholic archbishops
English Benedictines
Priors of Canterbury

13th-century deaths

Year of birth unknown
Year of death unknown